Elizabeth Nkunda Batenga is a Member of Parliament in the National Assembly of Tanzania.

Sources
 Parliament of Tanzania website

Living people
Members of the National Assembly (Tanzania)
Year of birth missing (living people)
Place of birth missing (living people)
21st-century Tanzanian women politicians